The Justice Ministry (Misrad HaMishpatim) is the Israeli government ministry that oversees the Israeli judicial system.

List of ministers
The Justice Minister (Sar HaMishpatim) is the political head of the ministry. Unlike other ministries, there has never been a Deputy Minister.

See also
Justice ministry
Politics of Israel

References

External links
Official website
All Ministers in the Ministry of Justice Knesset website

Justice
Ministry of Justice
Justice